Chitrakoot is a constituency of the Uttar Pradesh Legislative Assembly covering the city of Chitrakoot in the Chitrakoot district of Uttar Pradesh, India.

Chitrakoot is one of five assembly constituencies in the Banda Lok Sabha constituency. Since 2008, this assembly constituency is numbered 236 amongst 403 constituencies.

This seat belonged to Bharatiya Janta Party candidate Chandrika Prasad Upadhyay who won in last Assembly election of 2017 Uttar Pradesh Legislative Elections defeating Samajwadi Party candidate Veer Singh by a margin of 26,936 votes.

Members of the Legislative Assembly

Election results

2022

2017

16th Vidhan Sabha: 2012 Assembly  Elections

References

External links
 

Assembly constituencies of Uttar Pradesh
Chitrakoot district